Salvatore Piscicelli (born 4 January 1948) is an Italian director, screenwriter and film critic.

Born in Pomigliano d'Arco, after an activity as a film critic, Piscicelli started his film career with some documentary short films shot and set in his hometown. His feature debut film, Immacolata and Concetta: The Other Jealousy, won several awards including the Silver Leopard at the Locarno International Film Festival.  His 1981 film Le occasioni di Rosa entered the 38th Venice International Film Festival.  In 2001, using only digital supports, he shot Quartetto, the first Italian film to follow the dictates of the avant-garde filmmaking movement "Dogma". His last film is the 2003 biographical drama Alla fine della notte.

Filmography 
 Immacolata e Concetta, l'altra gelosia (1979)
 Le occasioni di Rosa (1981)
 Blues metropolitano (1985)
 Regina (1987)
 Baby gang (1992)
 Il corpo dell'anima (1999)
 Quartetto (2001)
 Alla fine della notte (2003)

References

External links 
 

1948 births
People from the Province of Naples
Italian film directors
Living people
Italian screenwriters
Italian male screenwriters